Love Songs, released on the Gold Label in 2000, contains a selection of songs from the Love Songs disc from the 1999 My Hits and Love Songs album.

Track listing

 "Ebb Tide" (Sigmon, Maxwell) - 2:21
 "Since I Fell For You" (Johnson) - 2:41
 "(What a) Wonderful World" (Sam Cooke, Lou Adler, Herb Alpert) - 2:16
 "It's All In The Game" (Dawes, Sigman) - 2:34
 "And I Love You So" (Don McLean) - 3:13
 "Let It Be Me" (Gilbert Bécaud, Mann Curtis) with Debby Campbell - 2:00
 "Time in a Bottle" (Jim Croce) - 2:19
 "You've Lost That Lovin' Feeling" (Phil Spector, Barry Mann, Cynthia Weil) - 4:21
 "Make It Easy On Yourself" (Burt Bacharach, Hal David) - 3:04
 "Only Love Can Break Your Heart" (Burt Bacharach, Hal David) - 3:20
 "The Rest Of The Road" (Thurman, Brasher) - 3:33
 "I Believe" (Drake, Graham, Shirl, Stillman) - 2:06

Personnel
Glen Campbell - vocals
Debby Campbell - vocals

Production
Producer - Jack Jackson/Jack Jackson Music Group, Nashville, TN
Recorder engineer - Bob Kruson
Remixes - Nick Smith, Kevin Stagg, Martin Smith, Howard Kruger and Jack Dorsey, England
Manufactured by The Gold Label -Honest Entertainment from TKO Licensing, Nashville, TN.

References

2000 compilation albums
Glen Campbell compilation albums